Lula kebab is a type of kebab cooked on skewers. It is made from minced meat. It is a specialty of Armenian, Azerbaijani, and other cuisines of countries in South Caucasus, the Middle East, and Central Asia.

Ingredients
 Mutton (or minced sheep and beef meat by 50:50)
 Onion
 Sheep tail fat
 Salt
 Pepper
 Sumac (optional)
 Lavash (optional)

Preparation

The soft portion of the mutton is ground with onion using a meat grinder and mixed with pepper and salt. There should be 400 grams of onion in per 1 kilogram of minced meat. This ratio is followed, to make it stay on the skewer. The meat mash is mixed well and stored in a cold for an hour. Later the mince is extracted from the refrigerator and is mixed well. The mince is wrapped around the skewer.  The mince gets slightly long form on a slightly wide skewer. Then it gets fried on coal barbecue, called a mangal. It's cooked for 10-15 minutes.  The kebab is served between the lavash. Sprinkling sumac on it is optional.

See also
 Kebab
 Adana kebab
 Şiş köfte
 List of kebabs

References

Armenian cuisine
Azerbaijani cuisine
Central Asian cuisine
Balkan cuisine
Skewered kebabs
Middle Eastern grilled meats